The Nuclear Institute is the professional body representing nuclear professionals in the UK.

It is a charity independent of the industry that promotes knowledge of nuclear energy amongst its members and the public and offers a route to professional qualification for those working in the sector, including nuclear engineers and scientists. It supports and encourages educational initiatives that will benefit the skills needed for design, build, operation, decommissioning and waste management of nuclear systems. It publishes Nuclear Future journal every two months and holds regular meetings throughout the UK; many evening meetings are open to the public and free of charge.

History
It was formed on 1 January 2009 from the merger of the British Nuclear Energy Society (BNES), a learned society, and the Institution of Nuclear Engineers (INucE), a professional institute. Both organisations had the same former address. The merger was agreed on 23 April 2008.  In 2010, the Institute became a member of the UK Science Council.  It is licensed by the Science Council to award Chartered Scientist status to qualifying members.

BNES
It was formed in 1962. It had around 1,400 members. The BNES formed the Young Generation Network in 1996. Its last president was John Earp.

INucE
Institution of Nuclear Engineers (INucE) was founded in 1959. It was a Nominated Body of the Engineering Council UK. Members of the institute would be given the title "Fellow of the Institution of Nuclear Engineers" (FINucE). The last president was David Whitworth.

Functions
It represents the UK nuclear power industry. It publishes Nuclear Future every two months. It holds conferences and meetings throughout the UK.

See also
 Institution of Mechanical Engineers
 Energy Institute
 European Nuclear Society
 Nuclear Energy Agency
 Nuclear Decommissioning Authority

External links
 
 Nuclear Future Journal
 
 

ECUK Licensed Members
Nuclear industry organizations
Nuclear technology in the United Kingdom
Organisations based in the City of Westminster
Scientific organizations established in 2009
2009 establishments in the United Kingdom